Cocoicola is a genus of fungi within the family Phaeochoraceae.

Species
As accepted by Species Fungorum;
Cocoicola californica 
Cocoicola cylindrospora 
Cocoicola fusispora 
Cocoicola livistonicola 
Cocoicola piperata

References

External links

Sordariomycetes genera
Phyllachorales